Wonderful You is a British drama television series made by Hartswood Films for the ITV network from 9 March until 13 April 1999.

Plot
It plots the lives of a group of people in their early thirties. The principal plot line revolves around the relationship between Marshall (Greg Wise), his girlfriend Clare and her old friend Henry (Richard Lumsden), who remains madly in love with her.

Cast
 Greg Wise as Marshall
 Richard Lumsden as Henry
 Lucy Akhurst as Clare Latimer
 Dorian Healy as Marco
 Miranda Pleasence as Heather
 Anna Wilson-Jones as Gina
 Paul Kynman as Eric
 James Grout as Jim
 Gary Powell as Drunk Man

Broadcast
The series was shown at 10 pm, after ITN moved their main evening newscast away from this traditional slot.

External links
 

1999 British television series debuts
1999 British television series endings
1990s British drama television series
1990s British television miniseries
ITV television dramas
ITV miniseries
Television series by Hartswood Films
English-language television shows
Television shows set in London